The 2014 Men's Pan-American Volleyball Cup was the ninth edition of the annual men's volleyball tournament, played by nine countries. It was held in Tijuana, Mexico, from 11 to 16 August 2014. The tournament served as a rating for the 2015 FIVB World League.

Pools composition

Squads

Venue
Centro de Alto Rendimiento de Tijuana, Tijuana, Mexico

Pool standing procedure
 Numbers of matches won
 Match points
 Points ratio
 Sets ratio
 Result of the last match between the tied teams

Match won 3–0: 5 match points for the winner, 0 match points for the loser
Match won 3–1: 4 match points for the winner, 1 match point for the loser
Match won 3–2: 3 match points for the winner, 2 match points for the loser

Preliminary round
All times are Pacific Daylight Time (UTC−07:00).

Pool A

Pool B

Pool C

Final round
All times are Pacific Daylight Time (UTC−07:00).

7th–9th places

9th place match

7th place match

Championship

Quarterfinals

Semifinals

5th place match

3rd place match

Final

Final standing

Awards

Best players

Most Valuable Player
  Rolando Cepeda
Best Scorer
  Maurice Torres
Best Spiker
  José Miguel Cáceres
Best Blocker
  Mannix Román
Best Server
  Kervin Piñerua
Best Digger
  Franco López
Best Setter
  Robert Boldog
Best Receiver
  José Rivera
Best Libero
  Franco López

All–star team

Best Setter
  Robert Boldog
Best Outside Spikers
  Javier Jiménez
  Rodrigo Villalba
Best Middle Blockers
  Mannix Román
  David Fiel
Best Opposite Spiker
  José Miguel Cáceres
Best Libero
  Franco López

External links
Official website

Men's Pan-American Volleyball Cup
International volleyball competitions hosted by Mexico
Men's Pan-American Volleyball Cup
Men's Pan-American Volleyball Cup
Men's Pan-American Volleyball Cup